Sidle may refer to:

People
 Don Sidle (1946–1987), American professional basketball player
 Elisa Sidler (1932), Swiss sprint canoer
 Heinrich Schweizer-Sidler (1815-1894), Swiss philologist
 Jimmy Sidle (1942–1999), American football player
 Randy Sidler (1956), former American professional football player
 Winant Sidle (1916–2005), Major General in the United States Army

Fictional characters
 Sara Sidle, in the television series CSI: Crime Scene Investigation
 "Lou" the sidler, in the Seinfeld episode "The Merv Griffin Show"

See also
 Side (disambiguation)
 Saddle (disambiguation)
 Sidel, a manufacturing company
 Sideways (disambiguation)
 Crabwalk (disambiguation)